The Sherwood Act of May 11, 1912 was the first important United States pension law in the 20th century. It awarded pensions to all veterans. Veterans of the U.S.-Mexican War and Union veterans of the Civil War could receive pensions automatically at age 62, regardless of disability.

References 

1912 in American law
Retirement in the United States
United States federal defense and national security legislation
United States federal veterans' affairs legislation